Necdet is a Turkish given name for males. People named Necdet include:

 Necdet Calp (1922-1998), Turkish civil servant and politician
 Necdet Darıcıoğlu, Turkish judge
 Necdet Karababa, Turkish politician
 Necdet Kent (1911–2002), Turkish diplomat
 Ahmet Necdet Sezer, Turkish politician
 Necdet Turhan (born 1957), Turkish visually impaired mountain climber and long distance runner
 Necdet Yaşar, Turkish musician

Turkish masculine given names